The men's 80 kg competition of the taekwondo events at the 2019 Pan American Games took place on July 29 at the Polideportivo Callao.

Results

Main bracket
The final results were:

Repechage

References

External links
 Results brackets

Taekwondo at the 2019 Pan American Games